Ministry of Regional Development of Russia was the federal ministry in the Russian government that was responsible for regional social development. The last minister was Igor Slyunyayev, who was appointed in 2012 as part of Dmitry Medvedev's Cabinet.

On 8 September 2014 President Vladimir Putin and Prime Minister Dmitry Medvedev approved the abolishing of the ministry with the competences being spread to a number of ministries.

Previous names
Ministry for Regional Policy (Министерство региональной политики Российской Федерации) (1998—1999)
Ministry for Nationality and Federation Affairs (Министерство РФ по делам федерации и национальностей) (1999—2000)
Ministry for Nationality, Federation and Migratory Policy (Министерство по делам федерации, национальной и миграционной политики РФ) (2000—2001)

Ministers
 Vladimir Yakovlev (September 2004 — September 2007)
 Dmitry Kozak (September 2007 — October 2008)
 Viktor Vasargin (October 2008 — April 2012)
 Vladimir Tokarev (April – May 2012)
 Oleg Govorun (May – October 2012)
 Igor Slyunyaev (October 2012 – September 2014)

See also

Ministry of Construction Industry, Housing and Utilities Sector

References

External links
 Official website (archived) 

Defunct organizations based in Russia
Regional Development
2004 establishments in Russia
2014 disestablishments in Russia